Orlando Fanasca (born 21 February 1983) is an Italian former footballer who played, as a midfielder, for Polisportiva Monti Cimini.

He played one game in the Serie A in his debut 2001–02 Serie A season for AC Fiorentina.

After released by his last fully professional club Barletta in 2010 Fanasca joined hometown club Marino of Eccellenza Lazio (6th highest level of Italy) in December 2010. He finished as the runner-up of Coppa Italia Dilettanti, and promoted to 2011–12 Serie D due to winner U.S. Ancona 1905 also won its league title. Fanasca renewed his contract at the start of season.

References

External links
 Career profile by tuttocalciatori.net

1983 births
Italian footballers
Living people
Serie A players
Serie B players
ACF Fiorentina players
Ternana Calcio players
F.C. Grosseto S.S.D. players
U.S. Pistoiese 1921 players
Atletico Roma F.C. players
A.S.D. Città di Marino Calcio players
Association football midfielders
People from Marino, Lazio
Footballers from Lazio
Sportspeople from the Metropolitan City of Rome Capital